Fatoumata Diop (born 10 August 1986) is a Senegalese sprinter specialising in the 200 and 400 metres.

Her personal bests are 24.05 seconds in the 200 metres (+0.1 m/s, Brazzaville 2015) and 52.79 seconds in the 400 metres (Brazzaville 2015).

Competition record

References

1986 births
Living people
Senegalese female sprinters
Athletes (track and field) at the 2015 African Games
Competitors at the 2011 Summer Universiade
Competitors at the 2013 Summer Universiade
African Games competitors for Senegal